Erki Savisaar (born 16 June 1978 in Vastse-Kuuste, Põlva County) is an Estonian politician. He has been a member of the XIII and XIV Riigikogu.

Savisaar is the son of former Prime Minister of Estonia Edgar Savisaar. In 2003, he graduated from Tallinn University in applied informatics.

From 2012 to 2015 he was the head of Tallinna Linnatranspordi AS's IT Department.

Since 2015 he is a member of Estonian Centre Party.

In 2018, he received Baltic Assembly Medal.

References

1978 births
Estonian Centre Party politicians
Living people
Members of the Riigikogu, 2015–2019
Members of the Riigikogu, 2019–2023
People from Põlva Parish
Tallinn University alumni